Gomolemo Thatayaone Motswaledi (1970–2014) was a Botswana politician and music composer who co-founded the Botswana Movement for Democracy in 2010. Motswaledi also co-founded Umbrella for Democratic Change and served as its first Secretary General until his death in 2014.

Motswaledi started his political career in the Botswana Democratic Party playing a key role in establishment of the party organ known as GS-26 whilst a student at University of Botswana. He later served in the BDP sub-committee before being elected to serve as Chairman of the National Youth Executive Committee between 2000 and 2004. He was elected party secretary general in 2009 but was shortly removed from the position after being suspended for 60 days and ultimately for five years by president Ian Khama at the height of party factional wars.

Biography 
Motswaledi was born 19 June 1970 in Mahalapye, Botswana. He was raised and schooled in Serowe. He performed his National Service (Tirelo Sechaba) in Shakawe, and received a Bachelor of Science in Sociology and History from the University of Botswana.

Motswaledi died in a car crash on 30 July 2014.

Political career 
 1st year at University of Botswana he joined Botswana Democratic Party (BDP)'s University students wing, the GS26 as Treasurer and later became its chairman
 President of BDP Youth league
 Joined Ministry of Labour and Home Affairs as Cultural Administrator
 Joined University of Botswana as administrator till his demise
 In July 2009 became Secretary General of Botswana Democratic Party's Central Committee
 In August 2009 he took President to court and lost with cost
 Ian Khama, then President of the Botswana Democratic Party suspended him from the BDP for 5 years and withdrew his candidature for Gaborone central parliamentary seat
 2010 BDP leaders tried to lock him in civil imprisonment and Batswana saved him by paying his debt
 March 2010-BDP faction Barata Phati met in Mogoditshane and agreed to leave the party
 29 May 2010 BDP splinter party Botswana Movement for Democracy  was officially launched
 Motswaledi became the Deputy interim Chairman of BMD and then interim Chairman
 Elected 1st President of BMD
 In 2012 Umbrella for Democratic Change (UDC) is formed and he became its 1st Secretary General
 2014 July 20-Serowe UDC debut congress elected him deputy president
 30 July 2014 he died in a car accident

Burial
Gomolemo Motswaledi was buried on Friday 8 August 2014 in his home village Serowe

References

1970 births
2014 deaths
People from Central District (Botswana)
Road incident deaths in Botswana
Botswana Democratic Party politicians
Botswana Movement for Democracy politicians
University of Botswana alumni